Nigel Foster (born 17 October 1952) is an English sea kayaker, kayak designer, instructor and author. He is the first and youngest paddler to circle Iceland by kayak.

Foster started paddling in Brighton, England when he was 15 in a skin-on-frame kayak. At Burwash Place Outdoor Activity Centre, Burwash, Sussex, England, Foster learned to handle whitewater, sea kayaking and surf kayaking. From 1971 to 1972 he was employed there as a "trainee instructor".  He enjoyed the mix of Outdoor Activity instruction and Environmental Studies education and decided to pursue this as a career. He attended a three-year teachers training course at Redland College, Bristol, and gained classroom experience with two years teaching at a school in Buckinghamshire.

In 1977, after his Iceland circumnavigation, Foster was employed by East Sussex County Council to teach as "instructor/teacher" at Burwash Place. Later in 1977 he was promoted to deputy warden.

At the same time he continued his explorations with trips that included the Atlantic coast of Newfoundland and a voyage from the English Channel through France down to the Mediterranean.
In 1981 when the center was closed as part of regional cutbacks to education spending, he was redeployed as a schoolteacher, but resigned in summer 1981 to attempt a major kayak expedition – a solo trip from Iqaluit  at the SE end of Baffin Island along Frobisher Bay to Resolution Island .

The tidal range in this area may exceed  while tidal streams may run at more than seven knots. After fighting the tidal streams in the dark near the Button Islands, suffering frostbitten fingers and loss of gear, Foster eventually gave up on this expedition. He was able to catch a ride on an oil tanker that happened to have taken shelter behind Killiniq Island . The trip was described by the editor of the BCU Canoeing Handbook in 1989 as "arguably the most impressive of any sea kayak adventure in the world."

After his return to England – from 1982 to 1985 – he worked as an instructor at the Plas Menai, National Water Sports Centre, North Wales, primarily instructing kayaking, canoeing, boardsailing, mountaineering, with a little water-skiing, and sailing, gaining the following British Canoe Union (BCU) national qualifications in these fields.

 BCU Level 5 Coach Sea Kayak
 BCU Level 5 Coach Surf Kayak
 BCU Level 3 Coach Inland Kayak (also 5 Star Award Inland Kayak)
 BCU Level 3 Coach Open Canoe (also 5 Star Award Open Canoe)

He also served for many years on the BCU Sea Touring Committee, and the BCU Expeditions Sub-Committee. 

In 1985 he left for Iceland for six weeks, helping an expedition group from Cambridge with logistics and leading the kayaking component. He returned to start his own kayaking business. He taught local groups in Denmark, Sweden, Iceland, Finland, Canada and the United States.

The design label "Foster Rowe" emerged for a while as a collaboration with two other top kayak coaches, (Andy Middleton & Ray Rowe)  with products such as paddling jackets, personal flotation devices (PFDs) and tow-systems designed for leading edge performance.

Subsequently working alone, the "Nigel Foster" signature paddle blade was released by Nimbus in Canada, and Foster worked in a design/consultant capacity with companies including Liquidlogic, Bending Branches and Extrasport in USA. (e.g. ExtraSport Tow-system).

In 2008, at the 6th Annual Induction Ceremony, Foster was inducted into the International Halls of Fame: Bicycling, Rowing, Canoeing, Kayaking as a Kayaker.

Since 2007 Foster has been the head of research and development at Point65. In addition to designing products forPoint65, He also acts as a spokesperson and assists the company with PR, marketing and special events. Foster presently lives in Seattle, WA with his wife Kristin Nelson.

References

Published works

 Storry, T, Ed. (1986) Snowdonia White Water Sea and Surf Appendix 1, 'The Sea Birds of North Wales, by Nigel Foster', pp 146–151, Milnthorpe Cumbria: Cicerone Press, 
 Storry, T., Baillie, M. and Foster, N. (1989). Raging Rivers, Stormy Seas. Dobbs Ferry: Sheridan House Inc, 
 Rowe, R, British Canoe Union et al. (1989) British Canoe Union Canoeing Handbook. second edition, Nottingham : British Canoe Union, 
 Foster, N. (1990) Canoeing: A Beginner's Guide to the Kayak. Arundel: Fernhurst Books, 
 Foster, N. (1997) Nigel Foster's Sea Kayaking. 2nd ed. West Sussex, England: Globe Pequot, 
 Foster, N. (1998). Nigel Foster's Surf Kayaking. Guilford: The Globe Pequot Press, 
 Foster, N. (1999) Guide to Sea Kayaking in Southern Florida. Guilford: Globe Pequot, 
 Foster, N. (2003) Open Canoe Technique: a Complete Guide to Paddling the Open Canoe. Guilford: Globe Pequot, 
 Foster, N. (2006) Kayaking: a Beginner's Guide. Arundel: Wiley, 
 Foster, N. (2009) Stepping Stones: of Ungava and Labrador. Parker CO: Outskirts Press, 
 Foster, N. (2012) Encounters from a Kayak: Native People, Sacred Places and Hungry Polar Bears. Falcon Guides, 
 Foster, N. (2016) On Polar Tides: Paddling and surviving the coast of Northern Labrador. Falcon, 
 Foster, N. (2017) Paddling Southern Florida: A guide to the area's greatest paddling adventures. Falcon Guides, 
 Foster, N. (2017) The Art of Kayaking: Everything you need to know about paddling. Falcon.  
Foster, N (2021) Heart of Toba: Batak Life beside the World's Largest Caldera Lake. Nigel Kayaks. 
 Foster, N. 'Winging It', Sea Kayaker, June 1996
 Foster, N. 'Paddle Float Rescue', Sea Kayaker, February 1997
 Foster, N. 'Kayaking with Polar Bears', Adventure Kayak Magazine, February 2010 
 see also http://nigelkayaks.com Magazine Articles

Filmography
Nigel Foster Sea Kayaking Series six instructional sea kayaking DVDs produced by Starling Productions, Inc.. Play by play log.

 Getting Started
 Essential Strokes
 Directional Control
 Rescues
 Forward Paddling
 Rolling and Bracing

Kayak Designs
 Vyneck – Foster first design in 1977 – an expedition kayak produced in association with Keith Robinson
 Rumour – Touring kayak built by Current Designs

The "Legend Series" produced by Seaward Kayaks are three expedition-capable sea kayaks designed for easy and fast cruising.
  
 Legend
 Silhouette sized for the smaller paddler
 Shadow sized for the larger paddler

The "Whisky Series" produced by Point65
 Whisky18 a longer version of the Whisky16 – no longer in production
 Whisky16 a rough-water playboat

Also built by Point 65
 Cappucino a day boat – no longer in production
 DoubleShot a tandem sea kayak

Sources
 Connecticut Sea Kayakers: Newsletter, June 1997
 Connecticut Sea Kayakers: Newsletter, May 2005
 Mats Bengtsson kayaking and kayak techniques: 'A One Day Kayak Course with Kayak Guru Nigel Foster'
 Sea Kayak Podcasts: 'Nigel Foster – the coach all sea kayak coaches respect. Another great personal tale.'
 Sweetwaterkayaks: 'Nigel Foster'
 Point65: 'Nigel Foster joins Point65!'
 Point65: 'Introducing the Whisky 16 and DoubleShot'

External links
 http://www.nigelkayaks.com/
 http://www.nigelfosterdesigns.com/
 http://www.nigelfosterkayaks.com/ – source for data on the DVD
 http://nigel-kayak.blogspot.com/

1952 births
Boat and ship designers
English male canoeists
Kayakers
Living people
Sportspeople from Seattle
Whitewater sports people
Writers from Seattle
Sportspeople from St Albans